The 2018–19 SHL season was the 44th season of the Swedish Hockey League (SHL). The regular season began in September 2018 and ended in March 2019. It was followed by the Swedish Championship playoffs and the relegation playoffs. The league consisted of 14 teams. The only new addition for this season was Timrå IK, who replaced Karlskrona HK after defeating them in the 2018 SHL qualifiers.

Färjestad BK won the regular season, and Frölunda HC won the Swedish Championship.

Teams

Regular season

Standings
Each team plays 52 games, playing each of the other thirteen teams four times: twice on home ice, and twice away from home. Points are awarded for each game, where three points are awarded for winning in regulation time, two points for winning in overtime or shootout, one point for losing in overtime or shootout, and zero points for losing in regulation time. At the end of the regular season, the team that finishes with the most points is crowned the league champion.

Statistics

Scoring leaders

The following players led the league in points, at the conclusion of matches played on 14 March 2019. If two or more skaters are tied (i.e. same number of points, goals and played games), all of the tied skaters are shown.

Leading goaltenders
The following goaltenders led the league in goals against average, provided that they have played at least 40% of their team's minutes, at the conclusion of matches played on 14 March 2019.

Playoffs
Ten teams qualify for the playoffs: the top six teams in the regular season have a bye to the quarterfinals, while teams ranked seventh to tenth meet each other (7 versus 10, 8 versus 9) in a preliminary playoff round.

Playoff bracket 
In the first round the 7th-ranked team will meet the 10th-ranked team and the 8th-ranked team will meet the 9th-ranked team for a place in the second round. In the second round, the top-ranked team will meet the lowest-ranked winner of the first round, the 2nd-ranked team will face the other winner of the first round, the 3rd-ranked team will face the 6th-ranked team, and the 4th-ranked team will face the 5th-ranked team. In the third round, the highest remaining seed is matched against the lowest remaining seed. In each round the higher-seeded team is awarded home advantage. In the first round the meetings are played as best-of-three series and the rest is best-of-seven series that follows an alternating home team format: the higher-seeded team will play at home for games 1 and 3 (plus 5 and 7 if necessary), and the lower-seeded team will be at home for game 2 and 4 (plus 6 if necessary).

Eighth-finals
The teams ranked 7 and 10, and the teams ranked 8 and 9, respectively, will face each other in a best-of-three series in order to qualify for the quarter-finals. The better-ranked teams in the two series will receive home advantage, i.e. two home games, if necessary. The two winners will take the two remaining quarter-final spots.

(7) Växjö Lakers vs. (10) Örebro HK

(8) HV71 vs. (9) Rögle BK

Quarter-finals

(1) Färjestad BK vs. (8) HV71 
Game 5 of this series was the second-longest Elitserien/SHL playoff game, with Oskar Steen's game-winning goal coming after 57:01 of overtime.

(2) Luleå HF vs. (7) Växjö Lakers

(3) Frölunda HC vs. (6) Malmö Redhawks

(4) Djurgårdens IF vs. (5) Skellefteå AIK

Semi-finals

(1) Färjestad BK vs. (4) Djurgårdens IF

(2) Luleå HF vs. (3) Frölunda HC

Finals

(3) Frölunda HC vs. (4) Djurgårdens IF

Statistics

Playoff scoring leaders 
The following players led the league in points, at the conclusion of matches played on 2 May 2019. If two or more skaters are tied (i.e. same number of points, goals and played games), all of the tied skaters are shown.

Playoff leading goaltenders 
These are the leaders in GAA and save percentage among goaltenders who played at least 40% of the team's minutes. The table is sorted by GAA, and the criteria for inclusion are bolded. Updated as of 2 May 2019.

SHL awards

References

External links

2018-19
SHL